The New International Reader's Version (NIrV) is a translation of the Bible in contemporary English. Translated by the International Bible Society (now Biblica) following a similar philosophy as the New International Version (NIV), but written in a simpler form of English, this version seeks to make the Bible more accessible for children and people who have difficulty reading English, such as non-native English speakers. The authors describe it as a special edition of the NIV written at a third grade reading level.

Zondervan and HarperCollins published a children's version of this text in 2011, targeted at 4 to 7 year olds and featuring the characters of the Berenstain Bears.

Example text
Here is a comparison of a passage from the First Letter to Timothy in the New King James Version, the New International Version, and the New International Reader's Version:

NKJV "And without controversy great is the mystery of godliness: God was manifested in the flesh, Justified in the Spirit, Seen by angels, Preached among the Gentiles, Believed on in the world, Received up in glory." (1 Timothy 3:16, NKJV)

NIV "Beyond all question, the mystery from which true godliness springs is great:  He appeared in the flesh, was vindicated by the Spirit, was seen by angels, was preached among the nations, was believed on in the world, was taken up in glory." (1 Timothy 3:16, NIV)

NIrV "There is no doubt that true godliness comes from this great mystery. Jesus came as a human being. The Holy Spirit proved that he was the Son of God. He was seen by angels. He was preached among the nations. People in the world believed in him. He was taken up to heaven in glory." (1 Timothy 3:16, NIrV)

See also 
 New International Version
 Modern English Bible translations

Notes

References

External links 
 New International Reader's Version (NIrV) Bible
 New International Reader's Version Bible
 New International Reader's Version Reading accessible online with concordance.

New International Version
1996 books
1996 in Christianity
Bible translations into English